The 2000 Harlow District Council election took place on 4 May 2000 to elect members of  Harlow District Council in Essex, England. One third of the council was up for election and the Labour party stayed in overall control of the council.

After the election, the composition of the council was
Labour 26
Liberal Democrat 8
Conservative 8

Election result
Both the Conservatives and Liberal Democrats gained 4 seats from Labour, reducing Labour to only holding 5 seats at the election, although they retained a majority on the council. Among the Labour councillors to be defeated was the chairman of the council John McCree in Brays Grove ward. Overall turnout at the election was 30.86%, up from 29.85% at the 1999 election.

Ward results

Brays Grove

Great Parndon

Hare Street and Little Parndon

Kingsmoor

Latton Bush

Little Parndon

Mark Hall South

Netteswell East

Netteswell West

Old Harlow

Passmores

Potter Street (2 seats)

Stewards

Tye Green

By-elections between 2000 and 2002

References

2000
2000 English local elections
2000s in Essex